A gaze palsy is the paresis of conjugate eye movements. 

Horizontal gaze palsy may be caused by lesions in the cerebral hemispheres, which cause paresis of gaze away from the side of the lesion, or from brain stem lesions, which, if they occur below the crossing of the fibers from the frontal eye fields in the caudal midbrain, will cause weakness of gaze toward the side of the lesion. These will result in horizontal gaze deviations from unopposed action of the unaffected extraocular muscles. Another way to remember this is that patients with hemisphere lesions look towards their lesion, while patients with pontine gaze palsies look away from their lesions.

The human Robo gene acts as a receptor for a midline repulsive cue. When Robo is mutated, the longitudinal tract formation is disrupted and therefore normal neuronal connections cannot form. This leads to the reduced hindbrain volume and scoliosis, which are common symptoms of horizontal gaze palsy.

References

Visual disturbances and blindness